The ELY Wind River Diversion Dam Bridge is a Warren pony truss bridge located near Morton, Wyoming, which carries Fremont County Road CN10-24 across the Wind River. The bridge's structure is integrated with the Wind River Diversion Dam; it was the first truss bridge to be connected with a dam during its construction. The Taggart Construction Company built the bridge from 1924 to 1925.

The bridge was added to the National Register of Historic Places on February 22, 1985. It was one of 31 bridges added to the National Register for its role in the history of Wyoming bridge construction.

See also
List of bridges documented by the Historic American Engineering Record in Wyoming

References

External links

Road bridges on the National Register of Historic Places in Wyoming
Bridges completed in 1925
Buildings and structures in Fremont County, Wyoming
Historic American Engineering Record in Wyoming
National Register of Historic Places in Fremont County, Wyoming
Warren truss bridges in the United States